Oberlin is a town in and the parish seat of Allen Parish, Louisiana, United States.  The population was 1,770 at the 2010 census. The town is named after Johann Friedrich Oberlin.

Oberlin was the home of Ernest S. Clements, a Democratic member of the Louisiana State Senate and, later, the Louisiana Public Service Commission. He ran unsuccessfully in 1944 for governor of Louisiana.

Geography
Oberlin is located at  (30.619560, -92.764058). Oberlin is located on U.S. Route 165 at LA 26.

Climate

Demographics

2020 census

As of the 2020 United States census, there were 1,402 people, 496 households, and 313 families residing in the town.

2000 census
As of the census of 2000, there were 1,853 people, 702 households, and 464 families residing in the town.

The racial makeup of the town was 60.28% White, 37.61% African American, 0.76% Native American, 0.27% Asian, 0.16% from other races, and 0.92% from two or more races. Hispanic or Latino of any race were 0.70% of the population.

There were 702 households, out of which 34.5% had children under the age of 18 living with them, 45.0% were married couples living together, 17.7% had a female householder with no husband present, and 33.8% were non-families. 31.3% of all households were made up of individuals, and 13.0% had someone living alone who was 65 years of age or older. The average household size was 2.43 and the average family size was 3.06.

In the town, the population was spread out, with 26.4% under the age of 18, 8.0% from 18 to 24, 25.1% from 25 to 44, 24.5% from 45 to 64, and 16.0% who were 65 years of age or older. The median age was 38 years. For every 100 females, there were 90.1 males. For every 100 females age 18 and over, there were 83.8 males.

The median income for a household in the town was $23,333, and the median income for a family was $30,583. Males had a median income of $28,558 versus $16,923 for females. The per capita income for the town was $12,050. About 18.3% of families and 25.5% of the population were below the poverty line, including 30.3% of those under age 18 and 31.1% of those age 65 or over.

Education
Allen Parish School Board operates Oberlin High School and Oberlin Elementary School in Oberlin.

Notable people
Hoyle Granger- former AFL and NFL player

References

External links

Towns in Louisiana
Towns in Allen Parish, Louisiana
Parish seats in Louisiana